Neo Mlumbi (born 3 April 1986) is a South African cricketer. He made his List A debut for Western Province in the 2016–17 CSA Provincial One-Day Challenge on 31 October 2016. He made his first-class debut for Western Province in the 2016–17 Sunfoil 3-Day Cup on 6 January 2017.

References

External links
 

1986 births
Living people
South African cricketers
Western Province cricketers
Cricketers from Cape Town